ECW: Extreme Music is a compilation album of songs related to Extreme Championship Wrestling during the late 1990s.  The album was released in 1998 through CMC International.  The executive producer was Bob Chiappardi of Concrete Marketing. Rights to the entire album are owned by the WWE since 2003.

All songs were performed by professional musicians. Additionally, many of the songs were covers.

The wrestler on the album cover was The Sandman. Each track also had a short introduction in the CD-booklet by a different selected wrestler, some who had the tracks specially selected for them.

Track listing

Credits
Executive producer: Bob Chiappardi
Associate producers: Jeff Sipler and Eric Pascal
Project manager: Russ Gerroir
Project attorney: Joe Serling and Wayne Rooks
Mastered at: Sterling Sound
Art direction: Randy Roberts and Ofer Ravid
Photographer: Mark Weiss

See also

Music in professional wrestling

References

Professional wrestling albums
Extreme Championship Wrestling
WWE
1998 compilation albums
1998 soundtrack albums
CMC International compilation albums
Heavy metal compilation albums